ETC HQ (stylised as etcHQ) is a Philippine infotainment show that aired on ETC from September 16, 2012 to July 7, 2013.

Final hosts
 Patti Grandidge 
 Julia Sniegowski
 Mike Concepcion
 Sam Sadhwani
 Kim Jones

See also
 ETC (SEC's women-oriented free TV channel)

References

External links
 

Philippine television shows
ETC (Philippine TV network) original programming
Radio Philippines Network original programming
2012 Philippine television series debuts
2013 Philippine television series endings
English-language television shows
Infotainment